L. B. Sriram (born Lanka Bhadradri Sri Ramachandra Moorthy; 30 May 1952) is an Indian actor, comedian, writer, playwright, producer, and thespian known for his works in Telugu cinema and Telugu theatre. He made his feature film debut with Kokila (1990) as a dialogue writer.

He owns the production house Life is Beautiful Creations. He subsequently went on to star in nearly 500 films in a variety of roles in works such as Chala Bagundi (2000), Ammo! Okato Tareekhu (2000), Azad (2000), Hanuman Junction (2001), Itlu Sravani Subramanyam, (2001), Aadi (2002), Dil (2003), Chatrapathi (2005), Evadi Gola Vaadidhi (2005), Stalin (2006), Seema Sastri (2007), Gamyam (2008), Sontha Ooru (2009), Yevadu (2014), Legend (2014) and Sarainodu (2016). Regarded as one of the finest method actors in Telugu cinema, Sriram has won five state Nandi Awards. He played Anjineyulu in the web series Amrutham Dhvitheeyam, a sequel to Amrutham.

Filmography

Film

Television

As writer

Awards

References

Living people
21st-century Indian male actors
Telugu comedians
Indian male screenwriters
Nandi Award winners
Filmfare Awards South winners
Indian male comedians
Male actors from Andhra Pradesh
Male actors in Telugu cinema
Indian male film actors
People from East Godavari district
Screenwriters from Andhra Pradesh
Telugu screenwriters
20th-century Indian dramatists and playwrights
21st-century Indian dramatists and playwrights
20th-century Indian male writers
21st-century Indian male writers
1952 births